Reagan is an unincorporated community in Henderson County, Tennessee, United States. Its ZIP code is 38368.

Reagan was originally called "Barren Springs", and under the latter name was founded in 1881. A post office called Reagan has been in operation since 1884.

Notes

Unincorporated communities in Henderson County, Tennessee
Unincorporated communities in Tennessee